Lovers Lane (also known as I'm Still Waiting for You) is a 1999 American independent slasher film directed by Jon Steven Ward and starring Erin J. Dean, Riley Smith and Sarah Lancaster. It also marks the feature film debut of Anna Faris. The film is based on the urban legend of The Hook, and follows a group of kids who are terrorized by an escaped mental patient in and around lovers lane.

Plot

Thirteen years ago, on Valentine's Day at the local lovers lane, Dee-Dee (Diedre Kilgore) and Jimmy (Carter Roy) are making out in their car when a maniac wielding a steel hook attacks them. The pair escape the car and find another couple, Harriet and Ward, slaughtered in the car next to theirs. Soon after, psychiatrist Jack Grefe (Richard Sanders) arrives, along with Sheriff Tom Anderson (Matt Riedy), who is distraught to find his wife, Harriet, is one of the lovers who has been murdered. The killer, Ray Hennessey (Ed Bailey) is caught, and revealed to be one of Jack's patients who had an obsession with Harriet. Ray is incarcerated in a nearby state institution for the criminally insane and gains the nickname "The Hook".

In present day, Jack's popular daughter Chloe (Sarah Lancaster) and Tom's socially awkward daughter Mandy (Erin J. Dean) attend the local high school together. During a class, Chloe hears her boyfriend Michael (Riley Smith) is planning to break up with her. In a fit of rage Chloe attempts to drown Michael in the pool. Jack is quickly called into the school about his daughters actions where he meets with Principal Penny Lamson (Suzanne Bouchard). Chloe is suspended from the school, while Michael is grounded by his mother, Principal Penny. Soon after, "The Hook" retrieves his weapon and escapes the mental institution. Upon hearing this news, Sheriff Tom warns Penny, as her husband had been having the affair with Harriet and was murdered along with her.

Later that night, Michael sneaks out of his room to meet his friends, including Chloe, Mandy, Bradley (Ben Indra), cheerleader Janelle (Anna Faris), joker Doug (Billy O'Sullivan) and couple Cathy (Megan Hunt) and Tim (Collin F. Peacock) at the bowling alley. Also there is Deputy David Schwick (Michael Shapiro), whom Sheriff Tom has put in charge of keeping Chloe and Mandy safe. After a while, Chloe, in an attempt to make Michael jealous, leaves with Bradley to go to lovers lane. As the pair travel in their car, Chloe enters a store, not realising the owner is murdered as she departs. Deputy David also enters the shop, only to be killed as well. Meanwhile, Penny discovers Michael is missing from his bedroom and alerts Sheriff Tom.

Meanwhile, Mandy, Michael, Janelle, Doug, Cathy and Tim arrive at lovers lane. The group find Bradley's car, only to discover he and Chloe have been murdered, before the hook arrives and stabs Tim to death. As the others try to escape in their car, Doug crashes into a tree, knocking everyone unconscious. After waking up, Mandy and Michael find the others gone. They travel to a nearby farmhouse where they arm themselves with a gun and find Janelle and Doug, who has broken his leg. While Janelle tends to Doug's injury, Mandy and Michael go to the barn to retrieve the missing owners car. Back inside, Janelle begins to hear noises before the hook smashes through a window. Janelle runs upstairs and barricades herself in a room, but the hook gets in and slaughters her. The hook then kills Doug.

In the barn, Michael and Mandy manage to get the car started. As Michael begins to drive he accidentally runs over Cathy, killing her. The pair re-enter the house and find Doug and Janelle dead before the hook attacks them. They lock themselves in the kitchen, and turn the gas on, before escaping out a window. As the hook opens the door, a match is sparked and the house blows up. Sheriff Tom and Penny go to Jack's house where they find a shrine devoted to Mandy, before rushing to lovers lane. At the farmhouse, Michael and Mandy take the owners car and begin to travel into town. On the way, they find Chloe still alive, who urges them to return to lovers lane as Bradley has also survived. Upon arrival, Mandy leaves Michael and Chloe in the car, only to find Bradley is actually dead, before she is dragged away into a bush. In the car, Chloe attacks Michael with a hook, revealing herself as the killer. Michael escapes, but as Chloe exits she is slaughtered by an unseen figure.

Mandy is forced into a car by her attacker, revealed to be Jack who tells her he was the one that had killed Mandy's mother, Harriet, and had survived the explosion at the farmhouse. Michael saves Mandy, and as a fight breaks out, Tom and Penny arrive and shoot Jack before Mandy kills him with a hook.

The next day at lovers lane, Mandy and Michael are medically checked before they leave. Tom and Penny enter a police car, that is revealed to be driven by Ray, "The Hook".

Cast
Erin Dean as Mandy Anderson/Harriet Anderson
Jori Wanquist as Young Mandy Anderson
Riley Smith as Michael Lamson
Sarah Lancaster as Chloe Grefe
Anna Faris as Jannelle Bay
Billy O'Sullivan as Doug
Matt Riedy as Sheriff Tom Anderson
Suzanne Bouchard as Principal Penny Lamson
Richard Sanders as Dr. Jack Grefe
Megan Hunt as Cathy
Collin F. Peacock as Tim
Ben Indra as Bradley
Michael Shapiro as Deputy David Schwick
Ed Bailey as Ray Hennessey
Diedre Kilgore as Dee-Dee
Carter Roy as Jimmy

Production 
The film was shot on location in Seattle, Washington.

Reception 
Jon Condit from Dread Central stated, "Down a few cold ones and enjoy a return to simpler times. Back when little things like scripts, budgets, and knowing winks were not required."

Notes

References

External links
 
 

1999 films
American slasher films
1999 horror films
1990s slasher films
American independent films
Films based on urban legends
Films shot in Washington (state)
Valentine's Day in films
Holiday horror films
1990s English-language films
1990s American films